Eugen Jensen (1871–1957) was an Austrian stage and film actor. He worked frequently in the Austrian and German cinemas during the silent era in supporting roles in films such as The Love of Jeanne Ney (1927). Following the Anchluss of 1938, Jensen emigrated to Switzerland. He was married to the actresses Alice Lach and Rosa Montani.

Selected filmography
 In Thrall to the Claw (1921)
 The Grinning Face (1921)
 The House in Dragon Street (1921)
 The Separating Bridge (1922)
 The Portrait (1923)
 Hotel Potemkin (1924)
 The Uninvited Guest (1925)
 The Third Squadron (1926)
 Lützow's Wild Hunt (1927)
 The Love of Jeanne Ney (1927)
 Die Fledermaus (1931)
 Der Herzog von Reichstadt (1931)
 Reckless Youth (1931)
 Wehe, wenn er losgelassen (1932)
 The Magic Top Hat (1932)
 Adventures on the Lido (1933)
 A Thousand for One Night (1933)

References

Bibliography
 Eisner, Lotte H. The Haunted Screen: Expressionism in the German Cinema and the Influence of Max Reinhardt. University of California Press, 2008.

External links

1871 births
1957 deaths
Austrian male stage actors
Austrian male film actors
Austrian male silent film actors
Male actors from Vienna
Emigrants from Austria after the Anschluss
20th-century Austrian male actors